Humerœuille is a commune in the Pas-de-Calais department in the Hauts-de-France region of France.

Geography

Population
The inhabitants are called Humerœuillois.

Places of interest
 The church of St. Vaast, dating from the eighteenth century.
 The eighteenth-century chateau.

See also
 Communes of the Pas-de-Calais department

References

External links

  web site with further information and photographs about Humeroeuille

Humeroeuille